Iping and Stedham Commons is a nature reserve owned and managed by the Sussex Wildlife Trust. It is a  biological Site of Special Scientific Interest (designated as Iping Common but covering both commons) near the villages of Iping and Stedham, west of Midhurst in West Sussex. It is also a Local Nature Reserve and a Nature Conservation Review site, Grade 2.

This is described by Natural England as one of the richest areas of heath in the county. Most of it is dry but there are also areas of wet heath, two ponds, woodland, scrub and grassland. It has a rich invertebrate fauna and breeding heathland birds include nightjars and stonechats.

There is access from Elsted Road, which runs between the two commons.

References

External links 
 

Local Nature Reserves in West Sussex
Nature Conservation Review sites
Sites of Special Scientific Interest in West Sussex
Sussex Wildlife Trust